The registration plates of cars in Norway are maintained by the Norwegian Ministry of Transport and Communications. As in most countries, cars are identified only by number plates read visually. Each plate is a legal document that both identifies the vehicle and permits its use, and shall be returned to the registration authority when the vehicle is no longer in use.

The current alphanumerical system (two letters followed by four or five numbers) was introduced in 1971. The design of the plates remained the same until 2002, when the road authorities decided on a new font which standardized the width of each character. The new design was unsuccessful due to legibility issues, for example the letters "A" and "R" were often hard to distinguish. From 2006 the font was changed again to improve legibility, and space was provided for a blue nationality stripe with a Norwegian flag. From 2009, plates were made of plastic, and produced in a factory at Tønsberg. From 2012, plates are again produced in aluminum.

Licence plate design

The licence plates may have one of the following designs:

A – White reflective plate, black print 
For cars, trucks, buses, etc. taxed and fit to drive on public roads. Most cars in Norway have these plates. Motorcycles, mopeds, moped cars, trailers, caravans etc have plates with two letters and four digits.

B – Black plate, yellow print 
These are for all vehicles that are approved and deemed safe but never drive on public roads. This includes logging and mining equipment, snowmobiles, various transports at airports and ports, etc. Such vehicles are tax exempt. Vehicles registered on Svalbard also use these plates, as according to the Svalbard Treaty, national taxes may not be levied on Svalbard.

C – Black plate, white print 
Rally and other competition cars. The vehicle may be driven legally on the road to and from training and events if a NMF licence and a statement from the local club on training times is presented. Insurance and road tax has to be paid, but there is no import tax on new vehicles.

D – Orange plates, black print 
Military cars, trucks, buses, tanks etc.

Orange plates with red print are military cars, such as tanks etc., see class I below

E – Green reflective plate, black print 
For cars, vans, small trucks, etc. taxed and fit to drive on public roads, equipped with only one row of seats (driver included) and with sufficient internal volume to fit a crate 140 cm long by 90 cm wide by 105 cm high. This category is primarily intended for tradesmen, couriers and such, but there is no restriction on who can own or operate such a vehicle. Vehicles with green plates are taxed more lightly than vehicles with white plates.

F – Blue plate, yellow print 
These are diplomatic corps plates; they are used on official cars of foreign embassies and consular services. These plates always use prefix CD.  The first two digits shows which diplomatic mission the vehicle belongs to. They are tax exempt.

G – Red plate, white print 
Dealer plates. These plates are assigned to car dealerships and used for ferrying or test driving. They can be moved freely from car to car.

Since mid 2015 there is a new format starting from AAA10. This format is centrally issued.

Dealer plates for trailers has a T as suffix.

H – Red plate, black print 
Stickers used for ferrying or testing unregistered but roadworthy vehicles, prototypes etc.  Issued on day-to-day basis at a cost of NOK 310 per day. The date of issue is printed to the right of the registration number.

I – Orange plate, red print 
Military test plates, with two or three letters (FMU or T-U) followed by three number with leading zero. FMU is for "Forsvarsmuséet" (the Armed Forces Museum) or T-U for "Test og utvikling" (testing and development).

J – White plates, black print, red margins 
Export and tourist plates. No letters. Left and right is a red border with the month/year of expiry written vertically.

Personalised number plates 
Starting in 2017, it is possible to apply for personalised number plates bearing any combination of two to seven letters and digits, with certain exceptions, mainly for offensive words or phrases and registered trademarks. Subject to those conditions, and upon payment of a NOK 9 000 fee, the applicant is granted the exclusive right to use the requested registration number on any class A or E vehicle they own for ten years.

Validation sticker 

Between 1993 and 2012, self-adhesive validation stickers in primary colours were issued annually to every car that had valid road tax and insurance and had passed its latest biennial safety and emissions test. The stickers included the registration number in the form of a bar code, and changed colour every year on a three-year cycle: red, blue and yellow.

The use of validation stickers was discontinued from May 2012. The police will now rely on automated systems which photograph the number plate, identify the registration number using optical character recognition, and check the car's status in a database.

Nationality stripe 

Norwegian plates manufactured after 1 November 2006 have a nationality stripe on the left end of the plates. This stripe is blue with Norway's national flag and international vehicle registration code "N", in a similar format to that used by many central European countries before they became EU members. The resemblance to EU registration plates infuriated some adherents of the anti-EU movement, leading the Public Roads Administration to issue white or black adhesive labels with which they could cover the blue stripe.

Manufacture of licence plates 
The manufacture of licence plates is strictly controlled by the authorities. Plates are provided when a registration application is accepted. If plates are stolen, new ones will not be issued until a police enquiry is complete. Plates of all types, except some F-type plates, were previously produced in aluminium. Between 1 January 2009 and 31 December 2011, plates were made of plastic, which made them slightly thicker than the older aluminium ones (requiring thicker plate holders). These plates were much less expensive. They had a transparent plastic layer on top of the layer with the writing, which was especially prone to breaking on impact during cold weather (such as being hit by another car's trailer hitch). This, in addition to the higher recycling costs of plastic compared to aluminium led to the cessation of plastic plates in favour of aluminium ones as of 1 January 2012, although with the same price as the plastic plates.

Prefixes and sequence numbers 

All Norwegian licence plates for civilian vehicles have a prefix of two letters, followed by a sequence of numbers. Military licence plates have numbers only. Most vehicles have five-digit registration numbers between 10000 and 99999. Motorcycles, farming equipment and trailers have four-digit registration numbers between 1000 and 9999 is used. Temporary plates have three-digit registration numbers between 100 and 999. Dealer plates have two-digit registration numbers between 10 and 99.

Special prefixes are:
 CD: Corps Diplomatique
 EL, EK, EV, EB, EC, ED and EE: Electrically powered vehicles (not hybrids)
 FE: Former military vehicles (of vintage 2005 or later) sold or transferred to civilian use
 GA: autogas/LPG (liquified petroleum gas) or other gas powered vehicles
 HY: Hydrogen powered vehicles
Ordinary vehicle plates have a prefix based on the geographic location for the first registration, and will be unchanged later.

The letters G, I, O and Q are not used due to their similarity with other letters or numbers; an exception is that CNG vehicles such as gas buses use "GA". M and W were originally not used as they are much wider than other letters, but some codes including W are now assigned. The Norwegian letters Æ, Ø, and Å are not used either. Additionally, the combinations "NS" and "SS" have been omitted because of their connotations to World War II. (Although SS is in use on four-digit plates used for motorcycles, tractors and trailers etc.)

When a vehicle is scrapped or exported, the registration number/chassis is tagged as such, and the vehicle is no longer allowed to travel by road. Neither can the registration number be reused. Example; BL50000 will always be the real-life version of the legendary "" from the Flåklypa Grand Prix movie.

Single-letter plates are reused when vacant, but only available for vintage vehicles from 1971 or earlier.

If a set of licence plates is stolen, the vehicle will be re-registered on different plates.

Diplomatic Corps codes 
The diplomatic fleet is identified by a code built up by CD <nn><abc> where <nn> is the country identifier as described below and <abc> is a sequence number.

Other issues 
Norway does not have any particular numbering scheme or plate kind to indicate vehicle usage such as police, taxi, ambulance or others, except for type E plates used by foreign diplomats.

The numbers for all plates except type C have a code consisting of two letters and a serial number. Class C only carries a sequence number. The letters identify the district in which the vehicle was first registered. For example, in Stavanger, prefixes like RE, RH and RJ are used. The car registration number is not altered when the owner moves to another town, or if it is sold.

The registration number is assigned to a vehicle's chassis number (often etched into the wall, or on a plaque inside the engine room (older cars), or on a small plate in the lower corner of the windscreen (newer cars)) when it is first imported to Norway. Example; A Toyota Corolla from 1972 imported and first-time registered in Oslo would have the letters DA assigned to its chassis number (KE20-XXXXX) + the five numbers that makes the car unique. Also, registration numbers are usually assigned to groups of cars imported into Norway. Another example; If a car dealer imports 16 cars to Hamar in one shipment, the entire shipment would, as an example, be registered as FS10000, FS10001, and so on, up to FS10015. A way of seeing how old a car is from its registration number is noticing the car's age and compare it to the registration number, as a 1970–1973 model car registered in Oslo will have the DA-prefix. This is not always the cause, as it depends on when the car is imported into Norway. Oslo began in 1971 with "DA", and proceeded to "DB" around 1974, to DC in 1977, DD around 1980, DE around 1984, DF around 1987, DH in 1992, DJ around 1997, DK around 2000, DL around 2006, DN around 2008, and DP around 2010. A car may also have been assigned a new registration number after its former one has been reported stolen or lost.

The city of Bergen is currently on their SV-series.  However SV is also used as the short form for "Sosialistisk Venstreparti" (Socialist Left Party) a political party, which has caused some people from Bergen to register their cars elsewhere.

History 

From 1 April 1900 to 31 March 1913 regional license plates with only digits were in use. The license plates were in black with digits and the name of the province/town in white. Surviving vehicles from the period may use the original license plates. Only a handful of such vehicles exist today.

From 1 April 1913 to 31 March 1971 only a single letter was used on Norwegian vehicle license plates. From 1958 an additional series with 6 digits in 3 groups was in use in Oslo.
Vehicles older than 1971 (import or Norwegian) may use single-letter plates of the current owners choice, although within existing letter codes and 3–6 digits, or 6 digits without letter. Once chosen, the license plates follow the vehicle. Common practice is to use the earliest known or available single-letter plates on which the car was registered.

Registration letter codes 1913–1971

County (name before / from 1918): 
A: Kristiania amt / Oslo
B: Smaalenenes amt / Østfold
C: Akershus amt / Akershus
D: Hedemarkens amt / Hedmark
E: Kristians amt / Oppland
F: Buskeruds amt / Buskerud
G: Jarlsberg og Larviks amt / Vestfold until 1929: G
Z: Vestfold from 1929
H: Bratsberg amt / Telemark
I: Nedenes amt / Aust-Agder
K: Lister og Mandals amt / Vest-Agder
L: Stavanger amt / Rogaland
O: Bergen amt / Bergen
R: Søndre Bergenhus amt / Hordaland
S: Nordre Bergenhus amt / Sogn og Fjordane
T: Romsdals amt / Møre og Romsdal
U: Søndre Trondhjems amt / Sør-Trøndelag
V: Nordre Trondhjems amt / Nord-Trøndelag
W: Nordlands amt / Nordland
X: Tromsø amt / Troms
Y: Finmarken amt / Finnmark

See also

 List of international vehicle registration codes
Vehicle registration plates of Europe

References

External links
 

Law of Norway
Norway
Road transport in Norway
Norway transport-related lists
 Registration plates